Renier de Huy (or Rainer of Huy) (also Reiner, van, etc. in any combination) was a 12th-century metalworker and sculptor to whom is attributed a major masterpiece of Mosan art, the baptismal font at St Bartholomew's Church, Liège in Liège, Belgium of 1107–18. The Meuse river valley in modern Belgium and France, roughly comprising the Diocese of Liège, was the leading 12th century centre of Romanesque metalwork, which was still the most prestigious medium in art.  Nothing is known of Rainer's life other than that a "Reinerus aurifaber" witnessed a charter of the Bishop of Liège relating to a church in Huy in 1125, but the 15th century Liège chronicle mentions him as the artist of the font. He may have died about 1150. Another equally shadowy figure in Mosan metalwork from the next generation, Godefroid de Huy/de Claire, also came from the small but prosperous city of Huy on the Meuse.

The only other work generally agreed to be by the same master as the font is a small bronze crucifix figure (Schnütgen Museum, Cologne); another in Brussels is probably from the same mould, with extra chasing.  Others in Brussels and Dublin are probably from the workshop as they have many similarities.

Notes

References
Beckwith, John.  Early Medieval Art: Carolingian, Ottonian, Romanesque, Thames & Hudson, 1964 (rev. 1969), 
Calkins, Robert G.; Monuments of Medieval Art, Dutton, 1979, 
 Lasko, Peter, Ars Sacra, 800–1200, Yale University Press, 1995 (2nd edn.) 
"Oxford": Rainer of Huy: The Oxford Dictionary of Art." Accessed 10 January 2010, 
Swarzenski, Hanns. Monuments of Romanesque Art; The Art of Church Treasures in North-Western Europe, Faber and Faber, 1974, 
Xhayet, Geneviève and Halleux, Robert (eds), Études sur les fonts baptismaux de Saint-Barthélémy à Liège, Editions du CEFAL, 2006, 9782871302124 google books

External links 

Metalworkers
Mosan art
Belgian goldsmiths
Romanesque artists
Early Netherlandish art
Early Netherlandish sculptors
1150 deaths
Year of birth unknown
Year of death uncertain
12th-century sculptors
People of medieval Belgium
12th-century people of the Holy Roman Empire